Qualification for the 1993 FIBA European Championship, commonly called FIBA EuroBasket 1993 took place between 1 May 1991 and 7 June 1993. A total of thirteen teams qualified for the tournament, joining Italy, Spain and France ranked second, third and fourth in the 1991 edition. Yugoslavia as title holder was excluded from all international sport competitions because of sanctions against Federal Republic of Yugoslavia.

Format
A total of 39 teams participated. Competition consisted of three stages:

A qualifying round that consisted of twelve teams divided in two round robin tournament that took place in Reykjavík-Iceland and Neuchâtel-Switzerland between 1 May and 12 May 1991.
A challenge round where the first and second teams from each of the two groups from the Qualifying Round joined another twelve teams. All sixteen teams where then divided in four round robin groups of four teams each. This stage took place between 13 November 1991 and 18 November 1992 and competition consisted of home and away legs, taking place in each of the participating countries. The top two teams from each group qualified for EuroBasket 1993.
A pre-European rournament – Due to politic changes in Eastern Europe caused by breaks of two big countries, Soviet Union and Yugoslavia, which dominated in European basketball in recent decades, FIBA Europe organized an additional qualifying tournament, that took place in Wrocław, Poland, between 30 May 1993 and 7 Jun 1993, in order to enable the new countries the participation at championship. The third classified from each of the four groups from the Challenge Round joined another eleven teams. All fifteen teams where divided in four round robin tournament. The first two teams of each group have been divided into two round robin groups of four teams each. The top three teams of each groups have participated to Finals where the top five teams qualified for EuroBasket 1993.

Qualifying round

Group A (Reykjavík, Iceland)

|}
Rules=1) Points; 2) Head-to-head results; 3) Points difference; 4) Points scored.

Group B (Neuchâtel, Switzerland)

|}
Rules=1) Points; 2) Head-to-head results; 3) Points difference; 4) Points scored.

Challenge Round

Group A

|}
Rules=1) Points; 2) Head-to-head results; 3) Points difference; 4) Points scored.

Group B

|}

Group C

|}
Rules=1) Points; 2) Head-to-head results; 3) Points difference; 4) Points scored.

Group D

|}

Pre-European Tournament (Wrocław-POL)

Group A

|}

Group B

|}

Group C

|}

Group D

|}

Final Round (Wrocław-POL)

Group E

|}

Group F

|}

Final

Places 3–5

Places 5–6

Final standings

External links

qualification
1991–92 in European basketball
1992–93 in European basketball
1993–94 in European basketball
1993